The Delta Valley and Southern Railway  is a short-line railroad headquartered in Wilson, Arkansas.

DVS operates a two-mile line in Arkansas near Wilson with one switch engine.

The line is the former  St. Louis-San Francisco Railway branch from Elkins to Deckerville. All but  from Delpro to Elkins was abandoned in 1947.

, the railroad operated from its enginehouse at the present end of the line to a connection with the Burlington Northern Santa Fe (BNSF) south of Wilson. The line served one cotton processing plant owned by the R.E.L. Wilson company. Motive power was a GE 45-tonner side-rod locomotive, purchased new in May 1954, GE s/n 32129. The locomotive, DV&S 50, is on the National Register of Historic Places. The locomotive was housed in a single stall engine house built right over the main line of this short railroad, at the end of the line. However, that locomotive was sold in 2009.

Corporate headquarters are located in the company town of Wilson, Arkansas. The corporate office is on the south side of the central business district in Wilson.

Surviving equipment
No. 73 is a 2-6-0 “Mogul” built by Baldwin in 1916.  It has 19" cylinders and 49-1/2" driving wheels.  Numbered as 34 by the Jonesboro, Lake City and Eastern Railroad before that line was sold to the St. Louis-San Francisco Railway ("Frisco") in 1925, the locomotive was renumbered to 73 and kept by the Frisco until sold on September 19, 1945, to the Delta Valley and Southern.  It is preserved on the Lee Wesson Plantation in Victoria, Arkansas under the Delta Valley & Southern Locomotive No. 73 name with no visible numbers on the cab or tender, but with the original Frisco raccoon-skin-shaped number board and “73” on its nose.

References

Arkansas railroads
Switching and terminal railroads
Spin-offs of the St. Louis–San Francisco Railway
Wilson, Arkansas
Transportation in Mississippi County, Arkansas
Transportation in Washington County, Arkansas